Michael Patrick Kelly (Paddy Kelly) was born on December 5, 1977. He is an Irish-American singer, musician and composer. Kelly was born in Dublin. He came to fame as the third-youngest member of the pop and folk band The Kelly Family, who belong to the commercially most successful acts in Europe with over 20 million records sold since the mid-1990s. After years in the public eye, Kelly released his debut solo album In Exile and shortly thereafter retired to a monastery in France. After six years he returned to the music business in 2011. Kelly currently resides in Germany.

Discography

Studio albums

Live albums
 2013: In Live – Solo & Unplugged (as Paddy Kelly)

Singles

Other releases
 2015: "Beautiful Soul"
 2017: "How Do You Love"
 2017: "Awake"
 2017: Sing meinen Song: Das Weihnachtskonzert Volume 4, various artists

Video album
 2013: In Live – Solo & Unplugged (as Paddy Kelly)

Awards and nominations

References

1977 births
Irish people of American descent
Performers of Christian music
Irish Christian monks
Living people
Singers from Dublin (city)
Irish expatriates in France
Irish expatriates in Germany
20th-century Irish male singers
20th-century American male singers
20th-century American singers
21st-century Irish male singers
21st-century American male singers
21st-century American singers